Godovo is a village located in the municipality of Tutin, southwestern Serbia. According to the 2002 census, the village has a population of 124 inhabitants.

References

Populated places in Raška District